Kaarmise is a village in Saaremaa Parish, Saare County in western part of Estonia.

The native language is Estonian.

Before the administrative reform in 2017, the village was in Lääne-Saare Parish.

References

Villages in Saare County